USRC Commodore Barry was a vessel that the US Revenue Cutter Service bought in 1812, before the outbreak of the War of 1812. The British captured her in August of the same year. She served briefly in November as a privateer out of Saint John, New Brunswick under the name Brunswicker before being laid up that same month. She was sold in 1815.

Commodore Barry
The US government bought this schooner on 20 March 1812 for US $4100 from Stephen Mitchell of Sag Harbor, New York. On 31 April Daniel Elliot of East Machias, Maine, received a commission as a revenue cutter master, and brought the vessel back to eastern Maine. The schooner was stationed at Eastport, on Passamaquoddy Bay under the control of the local customs collector, Lemuel Trescott, and engaged in anti-smuggling operations.

Capture
 and  captured Commodore Barry on 3 August in the Little River, Bay of Fundy, together with three privateer schooners, Madison, Olive, and Spence (or Spruce). Each of the schooners was armed with two guns. Before the British captured the vessels many men from their crews escaped to batteries they had erected on shore and armed with guns from their vessels. The Americans resisted, inflicting some casualties, and then fled. Still, the British captured some men on Commodore Barry who remained prisoners of war until paroled in June 1813. The crew of Spartan received prize money for Commodore Barry in July 1820.

Brunswicker
In November, the provincial authorities in Saint John, New Brunswick bought the Commodore Barry for protection against American privateers. By this point the vessel was re-rigged as a sloop, but it is unclear when this happened.  On 19 November she sailed on a cruise with the 4-gun schooner . Together, they chased four American privateers from Passamaquoddy Bay. For this cruise Brunswickers crew consisted of 20 volunteers from Saint John. The province laid the sloop up on 24 November, but sailed her again in the spring of 1813.  Apparently the vessel had been very expensive to operate and with the Royal Navy asserting its dominance in the region by 1813, her services were no longer required.

Fate
The authorities in Saint John auctioned off Brunswicker on 4 July 1815, for £730. She had been in custody for 770 days.

Notes, citations, and references
Notes

Citations

References
 Smith, Joshua M. (2011) Battle for the Bay: The Naval War of 1812 (Fredericton, NB: Goose Lane Editions). 
 Snider, G.H.J. (1928) Under the Red Jack: Privateers of the Maritime Provinces of Canada in the War of 1812. (London:Martin Hopkinson & Co.).
 U.S. Coast Guard History Program: War of 1812 Revenue Cutters & Masters. 
 Wells, William R., II (1998) "US Revenue Cutters Captured in the War of 1812". The American Neptune Vol. 58, No. 3 (Summer), pp. 225–41. 

Ships of the United States Coast Guard
Ships of the United States Revenue Cutter Service
Brunswicker
Maritime history of Canada
Ships built in New Brunswick
Privateer ships
Sailing ships of Canada